Glorious Godfrey is a DC Comics supervillain who is part of The Fourth World series of comic books in the early 1970s.

Publication history
Glorious Godfrey first appeared in The Forever People #3 (June 1971) and was created by Jack Kirby.

In 1971, an article in The New York Times Magazine about "relevant comics" described "a handsome toothy character named Glorious Godfrey, a revivalist. Godfrey is drawn to look like an actor playing Billy Graham in a Hollywood film biography of Richard Nixon starring George Hamilton". The character was intended to embody the powerful, charismatic speaker who could talk people into justifying violence and evil.

Fictional character biography
Godfrey has a sister named Amazing Grace who is also a member of Darkseid's Elite. The siblings have similar powers. Whereas Amazing Grace's specialty is manipulation, Godfrey's is persuasion.

In his first appearance he confronts the Forever People, who had stumbled upon a recruitment program for Earth-based warriors for Darkseid. He personally leads an attack of Justifiers that almost kills the young warrior Serafin. Despite the efforts of the Forever People's semi-sentient Super-Cycle, Godfrey's attack would have succeeded in killing Serafin; however, Highfather chose at that moment to recall all his people (and the cycle) home via teleportation.

Godfrey remained a relatively unimportant character until 1986, when Legends (the first crossover since the Crisis on Infinite Earths) was published. In it, Darkseid attempts to deprive the world of its heroes, not only so that they would be ineffective against Darkseid, but also in the hopes that the people of Earth would more willingly surrender to his rule.

The first phase of the plan consists simply of creating immense amounts of collateral damage by sending creatures to Earth to fight the superheroes. The public begins to resent the heroes in their midst, and therefore Darkseid starts the second phase of his plan by sending the master manipulator Glorious Godfrey to Earth.

Assuming the identity of G. Gordon Godfrey (a reference to G. Gordon Liddy), he starts a hate campaign against the superheroes that proves to be very effective, riling the public and ultimately leading to a presidential decision to outlaw any super-heroic activity. The final phase of the plan consists of the Apokoliptian warhounds, cybernetic creatures that are bonded to human hosts, for which Godfrey is able to find an ample number of 'volunteers' among his hypnotized public. He leads his charges to Washington D.C., only to be confronted by a cadre of assembled heroes.

The heroes are able to defeat the Warhounds and separate them from their human hosts, with Godfrey jeopardising his image when he strikes a little girl who had been standing between the heroes and Godfrey's group of adults. After his initial weak attempt to justify his attack fails, Godfrey makes one last ploy by putting on the helmet of Doctor Fate in the hopes of obtaining his awesome might. Instead, the helmet mindwipes Godfrey, leaving him nothing more than an empty shell. He is sent to Belle Reve sanitarium, which he would later be broken out of by the Female Furies under the order of Darkseid.

Godfrey has subsequently made brief appearances among assemblages of all the Apokoliptian Gods.

Final Crisis
In Final Crisis #1, Reverend Godfrey Good appears on a TV news report, decrying the situation in Blüdhaven and the lack of government aid and assistance in dealing with the crisis in the ruined city. In between Final Crisis #1 and #2, Good is captured and transformed into a host for the essence of Glorious Godfrey. Godfrey taunts Dan Turpin and Batman, as Batman is imprisoned and Turpin transformed into the final host body for Darkseid.

In Final Crisis #4, Godfrey is present when Darkseid takes control over Turpin's body. However, in Final Crisis #5, Darkseid responds to his minion's impending death (presumably due to the fact that Godfrey's host body was not modified to successfully contain Godfrey's dark essence) by watching them die in front of him.

A one-shot revealed that Godfrey had been chosen by Darkseid to be the secretive, personal assistant to the Earth-based villain Libra. The man is given generic technology to support him throughout the years because Darkseid believed the man had potential for greatness. Godfrey's assistance turns out to be invaluable, as Libra is the key to Darkseid's defeat of Earth.

The New 52
In The New 52 (a 2011 reboot of the DC Comics universe), Glorious Godfrey makes his first appearance by giving greetings to Batman and Ra's al Ghul from Apokolips. He has a new look, sporting a beard and an all-black uniform with red gloves and belt. Glorious Godfrey's reason for coming to Earth is to retrieve the Chaos Shard, a powerful crystal which once belonged to Darkseid which Ra's al Ghul revealed was hidden inside the sarcophagus he crafted for Damian. After detecting a trace signature of the shard coming from inside Damian's body, and despite the assistance of the Justice League, Glorious Godfrey escapes with the corpse back to Apokolips, with Batman vowing to get Damian Wayne's corpse back.

Powers and abilities
Glorious Godfrey retains several attributes of a native of Apokolips, such as a limited level of superhuman strength, endurance and invulnerability. In addition, Godfrey has extended lifespan which allows him to exist indefinitely and he has an advanced immune system. However, Glorious Godfrey is a sub-par athlete and hand-to-hand combatant, whose greatest gifts are his overwhelming speaking voice and his extraordinary powers of persuasion. Whether these are natural gifts or have been augmented by the power of Darkseid has yet to be determined. Godfrey employs a private army called the Justifiers, composed of Earthmen who believe Godfrey's rhetoric and have had their perceptions completely contorted by Godfrey's words. The special helmets worn by the Justifiers allow Glorious Godfrey to control his soldiers even when they are not in his presence.

Inspiration
Jack Kirby biographer Mark Evanier states that Glorious Godfrey was based on evangelist Billy Graham:
"A lesser villain who toiled in the service of Darkseid was inspired more directly by evangelist Billy Graham, who was then rather difficult to avoid on TV. Kirby was appalled at some of Graham's apocalyptic sermons which — to Jack — were more calculated to instill fear than faith, and to stampede people into service of Graham's causes. Jack called the foe Glorious Godfrey, the name being a Kirbyesque pun. The comic book evangelist was "god-free" and also had some of the traits of TV pitchman Arthur Godfrey, though the main reference and the visual came from Billy Graham. Not evident in on the pages he drew was Jack's belief — which he expressed on several occasions — that Graham and the president he counseled were both virulent anti-Semites".

In other media

Television
 "Glorious" G. Gordon Godfrey appears in the Justice League two-part episode "Eclipsed", voiced by Enrico Colantoni. This version is the host of a sensationalist talk show that he uses to attack the Justice League's credibility. After the Justice League foil Eclipso's plot to destroy the sun, Godfrey's sponsors drop him while his show is moved to an undesirable time slot of 4 AM.
 Gordon Godfrey appears in Smallville, portrayed by Michael Daingerfield. This version is a human shock jock who attacks vigilantes, superheroes, and illegal aliens. After being possessed by Darkseid, he writes a best-selling book discrediting superheroes in the hopes of sowing mistrust and doubt through Earth's people's hearts and make them lose faith in their heroes. Lois Lane tries to expose Godfrey and Darkseid, but the latter fully takes over the former's body and tortures her to lure Clark Kent to him. Darkseid later meets with Granny Goodness, Desaad, and a brainwashed Oliver Queen to formulate a plan to remove Kent's powers with a Gold Kryptonite wedding ring. However, Chloe Sullivan rescues Kent, who in turn frees Queen from Darkseid's control. Queen eventually confronts and kills Godfrey, Goodness, and Desaad.
 G. Gordon Godfrey appears in Young Justice, voiced by Tim Curry in season two and by James Arnold Taylor in season three. This version is associate of Darkseid's who operates as a news show host with a xenophobic and anti-alien agenda. Throughout season two, Godfrey sows fears about the Justice League's alien members and use of alien technology, gradually gaining followers in the process. After the Reach arrive on Earth with an apparent desire for peace, Godfrey showers them with praise until they are forced to reveal their hidden armada. In season three, he criticizes Gretchen Goode's VR Goggles and her efforts to stop metahuman trafficking and clashes with Lex Luthor over who can slander the Outsiders more effectively.

Film
G. Gordon Godfrey appears in Reign of the Supermen, voiced by Trevor Devall. This version is an editorialist who wrote an article on how Earth's people need to be their own heroes instead of relying on metahumans.

External links
 Glorious Godfrey  at the Guide to the DC Universe

References

Characters created by Jack Kirby
Comics characters introduced in 1971
New Gods of Apokolips
Fictional television personalities
Fictional radio personalities
Fictional writers
DC Comics aliens
DC Comics characters with superhuman strength
DC Comics deities
DC Comics demons
DC Comics male characters
DC Comics characters who have mental powers
Billy Graham
Arthur Godfrey